Henry Childs is a former American football player.

Henry Childs may also refer to:

Henry H. Childs, politician
Henry Childs (judge), namesake of Childs, New York
Henry Childs (architect) on National Register of Historic Places listings in Providence, Rhode Island

See also
Henri Childs, politician
Harry Childs (disambiguation)
Henry Child, politician